Catherine the Great is a 1920 German silent historical film directed by Reinhold Schünzel and starring Lucie Höflich, Fritz Kortner, and Fritz Delius. The film was an epic portrayal of the life of Catherine the Great of Russia. 4,000 extras and 500 horses were used.

Cast

References

Bibliography

External links

1920 films
1920s biographical films
1920s historical films
German biographical films
German historical films
German epic films
Films of the Weimar Republic
German silent feature films
Films directed by Reinhold Schünzel
Films about Catherine the Great
German black-and-white films
Silent adventure films
1920s German films
1920s German-language films